Gerard Nash (born 11 July 1986 in Leixlip, County Kildare) is a former Irish professional footballer and coach.

Nash played his youth football with Leixlip United and Belvedere before joining the Ipswich Town academy. He played for Ipswich Town and also spent time on loan at Hartlepool United and Southend United before he was forced to retire in 2006 due to complications occurring after two cruciate ligament injuries.

He subsequently took up coaching roles at Ipswich, becoming the U18s manager in 2013 and later the same position in the U23s in 2016. He departed the club in May 2021 joining the Football Association of Ireland as High Performance Coach.

Playing career
Nash began his career playing youth football for his hometown club Leixlip United in Ireland. He also played youth football for Belvedere before moving to England to join the Ipswich Town academy in 2002.

He made his first and only appearance for Ipswich as a second half substitute in a 6–1 home win over Burnley at Portman Road on 14 October 2003. He also spent time on loan at Hartlepool United and Southend United during the 2005–06 season.

Nash was called up to the Republic of Ireland U21 side in January 2006. Although he had to pull out of the squad later that month due to domestic commitments.

Nash was forced to retire from playing football in 2006, at the age of 20, due to complications occurring after two cruciate ligament injuries.

Coaching career
Upon retiring from playing, Nash joined the Ipswich Town academy as a professional development coach. He took over as manager of the Ipswich Under-18 side after Russell Osman left the club in 2013. In 2016, Nash took over the role as manager of Ipswich's Under-23 side following the departure of current Under-23s manager Mark Kennedy.

Following the departure of Mick McCarthy as Ipswich manager in April 2018, Nash worked with the first-team alongside caretaker manager Bryan Klug and fellow Under-23s coach Chris Hogg for the remainder of the 2017–18 season. He worked with the first-team alongside Bryan Klug again in October 2018, following the departure of Paul Hurst.

He led Ipswich's Under-23 side to win the Professional Development League South Division title in 2019.

On 26 October 2020, Ipswich announced that Nash would be taking up a position with the first-team at Ipswich, whilst also monitoring the progress of players out on loan. The club announced that fellow Ipswich academy graduate Kieron Dyer would be replacing Nash as head coach of the club's under-23 side.

In May 2021, Nash left his position at the club, joining the Football Association of Ireland as High Performance Coach.

On 15 June 2022, Nash joined Aston Villa F.C. Academy as the Under-18s coach.

Career statistics

References

External links
Gerard Nash profile at the Ipswich Town F.C. website

1986 births
Living people
People from Leixlip
Association footballers from County Kildare
Republic of Ireland association footballers
Association football defenders
Belvedere F.C. players
Ipswich Town F.C. players
Hartlepool United F.C. players
Southend United F.C. players
English Football League players
Ipswich Town F.C. non-playing staff
Aston Villa F.C. non-playing staff
Association football coaches